EPT Miniatures is a range of Tékumel miniatures produced by Tékumel Games in 1983.

Contents
Sculpted by Bill Murray, Tom Myer, Jeff Barry, and Brian Apple, EPT Miniatures includes a full line of Tsolyani, Yan Koryani and Mu'Uglavyani military figures; a number of friendly nonhumans, several unfriendly nonhumans, creatures, and more.

History

EPT Miniatures is one many miniatures series produced for Tekumel wargaming, for use with the three rules sets available; Legions of the Petal Throne (1975), Missúm! (1978), and Qadardalikoi, 1983. A supporting set of army lists, The Armies of Tékumel were produced 1978-1998, and a painting guide, Miniatures from MAR Barker's World of Tékumel in 1982.

Reception
Frederick Paul Kiesche III reviewed EPT Miniatures in Space Gamer No. 71. Kiesche commented that "Tekumel lends itself to beautiful miniatures, what with the elaborate costumes worn by the priests and priestesses and the detailed armor worn by the military.  It is nice to see that Tekumel Games has been able to carry this beauty into the miniatures."

References

See also
 Legions of the Petal Throne, a 1975 Tékumel miniatures wargame
 Qadardalikoi, a 1983 Tékumel miniatures wargame
 The Armies of Tékumel, six army supplements for Tékumel miniatures wargaming, 1978-1998

Miniature figures
Tékumel